Maria Vladimirovna Shurochkina (born 30 June 1995) is a Russian competitor in synchronised swimming.

She has won six gold medals at World Aquatics Championships, three in 2013 and three in 2015. She also won a gold medal at the 2014 European Aquatics Championships, as well as two gold medals at the 2013 Summer Universiade.

Shurochkina is the younger sister of pop superstar Nyusha. Their father, Vladimir Shurochkin, is a musician and music producer, and former member of boyband Laskovyi Mai. Their mother, Oksana Baranovskaya, is a former competitive artistic gymnast. In 2017 Shurochkina had opened her dance school in Moscow.

Awards
Honored Master of Sports of Russia (31 December 2013).
Order of Friendship (25 August 2016) – for outstanding sports achievements at the Games XXXI Olympiad in 2016 in the city of Rio de Janeiro (Brazil), manifested the will to win and determination.
Honorary Diploma of the President of the Russian Federation (19 July 2013) – for outstanding sports achievements at the XXVII World Summer Universiade 2013 in Kazan.
Order of Honour (11 September 2021)

References

External links
 
 
 
 
 
  

1995 births
Living people
Russian synchronized swimmers
Olympic medalists in synchronized swimming
Olympic synchronized swimmers of Russia
Olympic gold medalists for Russia
Olympic gold medalists for the Russian Olympic Committee athletes
Synchronized swimmers at the 2016 Summer Olympics
Synchronized swimmers at the 2020 Summer Olympics
Medalists at the 2016 Summer Olympics
Medalists at the 2020 Summer Olympics
World Aquatics Championships medalists in synchronised swimming
Synchronized swimmers at the 2013 World Aquatics Championships
Synchronized swimmers at the 2015 World Aquatics Championships
Synchronized swimmers at the 2017 World Aquatics Championships
Artistic swimmers at the 2019 World Aquatics Championships
European Aquatics Championships medalists in synchronised swimming
Universiade medalists in synchronized swimming
Universiade gold medalists for Russia
Swimmers from Moscow
Medalists at the 2013 Summer Universiade